Am Brahmetal is a Verwaltungsgemeinschaft ("collective municipality") in the district of Greiz, in Thuringia, Germany. Since 1991 the seat of the Verwaltungsgemeinschaft is in Großenstein. One year later the name of the Verwaltungsgemeinschaft changed from Oberes Sprottetal to Am Brahmetal.

The Verwaltungsgemeinschaft Am Brahmetal consists of the following municipalities:

Bethenhausen 
Brahmenau 
Großenstein
Hirschfeld 
Korbußen 
Pölzig 
Reichstädt 
Schwaara

Verwaltungsgemeinschaften in Thuringia